The Peristeri Olympic Boxing Hall is an indoor arena that is located in Peristeri, west Athens. The hall was the site of the boxing events at the 2004 Summer Olympics in Athens, Greece. The venue originally seated 8,400, though it had a public capacity of only 5,600 for the 2004 Olympics.

History
After the 2004 Summer Olympics, the indoor facility was partially converted into a 3,000 seat outdoor football pitch. This lowered the seating capacity of the indoor arena from 8,400 to 2,305. The indoor arena has since been mainly used for gymnastics competitions, and at times to host basketball games of the Greek club Peristeri.

Since the summer of 2007, the outdoor association football pitch has been used as a training center by the Greek club Atromitos.

References

External links
Peristeri Indoor Hall @ Stadia.gr

Atromitos F.C.
Basketball venues in Greece
Indoor arenas in Greece
Olympic boxing venues
Venues of the 2004 Summer Olympics
Volleyball venues in Greece